Hokuto Vega (in Japanese: ホクトベガ, March 26, 1990 – April 3, 1997) was a Japanese Thoroughbred racehorse and the winner of the 1993  Queen Elizabeth II Cup.

Career

Hokuto Vega's first race was on January 5, 1993, at Nakayama, where he came in first. She picked up her next win at the 1993 Cattleya Sho on February 20.  She competed in her first graded race on March 20, 1993, when she won the 1993 Flower Cup. This win helped her gain entry into the 1993 Oka Sho, where she came in 5th place. On May 23, 1993, she competed in the Grade-1 Yushun Himba, where she came in 6th.  She came in 2nd place at the October 3, 1993, Grade-3 Queen Stakes. On November 14, 1993, she scored a major upset by winning the 1993 Grade-1  Queen Elizabeth II Cup, the biggest win of her career.

She went winless in 1994 except for picking up wins at the June 12th, Sapporo Nikkei Open and a win at the Grade-3 Sapporo Kinen.  She did not see victory again until June 13th, 1995, when she captured the 1995 Empress Hai. This was her only win of the year.

She has one of the most successful racing seasons ever in 1996. She won 8 of the 10 races she competed in during the 1996 season. Her wins in 1996 included victories at the Kawasaki Kinen, the February Stakes, the Diolite Kinen, the Gunma Kinen, the Grade-1 Teio Sho, the Grade-1 Mile Championship Nambu Hai and the Urawa Kinen.

Hokuto Vega's career fatally ended during the 1997 season. She won the 1997 Kawasaki Kinen on February 5, 1997, but her next race was her last.  During the 1997 Dubai World Cup, she fell and collided with Bijou d'Inde. She was euthanized shortly after. Due to transportation regulations, she could not be buried in Japan. Due to her sudden death, she did not produce any offspring.

Pedigree

References

1990 racehorse births
1997 racehorse deaths
Racehorses bred in Japan
Racehorses trained in Japan
Thoroughbred family 9-c